Rudolf Richter (7 April 1883 – 5 January 1962) was a Bohemian racewalker. He competed in the 10 km walk at the 1912 Summer Olympics.

References

1883 births
Czech male racewalkers
Olympic athletes of Bohemia
Athletes (track and field) at the 1912 Summer Olympics
1962 deaths
Athletes from Prague